The women's singles squash event of the 2015 Pan American Games was held from July 11–13 at the Exhibition Centre in Toronto. The defending Pan American Games champion is Samantha Terán of Mexico.

The athletes will be drawn into elimination stage draw. Once an athlete loses a match, they will no longer be able to compete.
Each match is contested as the best of five games. A game is won when one side first scores 11 points. A point is awarded to the winning side of each rally. If the score becomes 10-all, the side which gains a two-point lead first, will win that game.

Schedule
All times are Central Standard Time (UTC-6).

Results

Finals

Top Half

Bottom Half

Final standings

References

External links 
 Results on squashsite.co.uk

Squash at the 2015 Pan American Games
2015 in women's squash